Maret is both a French surname and a feminine Estonian given name, cognate to the English name Margaret. Notable people with the name include:

Surname:
 François Maret (1893–1985), Belgian poet, painter, and art critic
 Grégoire Maret (born 1975), Swiss musician
 Henry Maret (1837–1917), French journalist and politician
 Hugues-Bernard Maret, duc de Bassano (1763–1839), French statesman and journalist
 Jean-Baptiste Francois des Marets, marquis de Maillebois (1682–1762), Marshal of France
 Samuel Des Marets (1599–1673), French-Dutch reformed theologian and controversialist

Given name:
 Maret Ani (born 1982), Estonian tennis player
 Maret Balkestein-Grothues (born 1988), Dutch volleyball player
 Märet Jonsdotter (1644–1672), Swedish alleged witch
 Maret Maripuu (born 1974), Estonian politician
 Maret Merisaar (born 1958), Estonian biologist and politician
 Maret Olvet (1930–2020) Estonian graphic artist and printmaker
 Maret-Mai Otsa (1931–2020), Estonian basketball player and coach
 Maret G. Traber (born 1950), American biochemist
 Maret Vaher (born 1973), Estonian ski-orienteering competitor

See also
 Marett

Estonian feminine given names
French-language surnames